"When Someone Stops Loving You" is a song written by Hillary Lindsey, Chase McGill and Lori McKenna, and recorded by American country music group Little Big Town from their eighth studio album The Breaker. The song was released to country radio as the album's third single on June 26, 2017.

Content
The song is about the shattering pain resulting from a love gone wrong. However, instead of focusing on the heartbreak, the song talks about how the world is still spinning while you are struggling to get through the day. Despite the fact that everything seems to stop for the person experiencing the end of a relationship, everyone else is carrying on just like nothing has changed.

Charts

References

2017 songs
2017 singles
Little Big Town songs
Songs written by Hillary Lindsey
Songs written by Lori McKenna
Song recordings produced by Jay Joyce
Capitol Records Nashville singles
Country ballads
Songs written by Chase McGill